Dan Sullivan is an American politician serving as a member of the Arkansas Senate from the 20th district. He has served in the Arkansas General Assembly since 2015.

Education 
Sullivan earned a Bachelor of Science in Education from Arkansas State University and a Master of Science in Education from Truman State University.

Career 
Prior to entering politics, Sullivan worked as an employee of the  Behavioral Health Providers Association and CEO of Ascent Children's Health Services. He also represented the 53rd district in the Arkansas House of Representatives from 2015 to 2021. Sullivan was elected to the Arkansas Senate in November 2020 and assumed office on January 11, 2021.

References 

Living people
Arkansas State University alumni
Truman State University alumni
Republican Party members of the Arkansas House of Representatives
Republican Party Arkansas state senators
Year of birth missing (living people)
Politicians from Jonesboro, Arkansas